Valdez Creek (Ahtna: Ben K'atgge) is one of the small headwater tributaries of Susitna River in the U.S. state of Alaska.

Geography
Valdez Creek has cut its present channel through deep gravels and has intrenched itself in the underlying schist bed rock.

History
Gold placers were discovered in Valdez Creek in 1903. Mining was restricted at the time to two localities on the stream—Lucky Gulch and the vicinity of Discovery claim at the mouth of Willow Creek. A hydraulic plant was installed on Valdez Creek below Willow Creek in 1908 with about 120 men engaged in mining on Valdez Creek during that summer.

See also
 List of rivers of Alaska

References

Rivers of Alaska
Rivers of Matanuska-Susitna Borough, Alaska